The Watch Tower (1966) is a novel by Australian author Elizabeth Harrower.

Plot outline
Laura and Clare Vaizey are sisters living in Sydney in the period around World War II. When their father dies and their class-conscious mother decides to return to live in England the sisters are left to fend for themselves. Laura abandons her medical studies, goes to work in a factory and accepts a marriage proposal from Felix Shaw on the understanding that he will also look after her sister.  But Felix is an attention-hungry tyrant with a lack of empathy who sets out to belittle, gaslight and demean the two sisters at every opportunity.

Critical reception
.Reviewing the novel in The Washington Post on its reissue in 2012 Michael Dirda was unequivocal: "This is a harrowing novel, relentless in its depiction of marital enslavement, spiritual self-destruction and the exploited condition of women in a masculinist society. It reminded me of Zola in its unflinching depiction of two sisters entangled with a moody, violent man, one of them being gradually crushed into subservience, the other struggling desperately to save her own soul. It is a brilliant achievement." Praised by Patrick White in his letters edited by David Marr.

See also
 1966 in Australian literature

Notes
Text Publishing re-issued the novel in 2012 as part of their Text Classics series.

After the novel was re-issued the author was interviewed by Ramona Koval for The Monthly.

References

1966 Australian novels
Novels by Elizabeth Harrower
Novels set in Sydney